Polio vaccines are vaccines used to prevent poliomyelitis (polio). Two types are used: an inactivated poliovirus given by injection (IPV) and a weakened poliovirus given by mouth (OPV). The World Health Organization (WHO) recommends all children be fully vaccinated against polio. The two vaccines have eliminated polio from most of the world, and reduced the number of cases reported each year from an estimated 350,000 in 1988 to 33 in 2018.

The inactivated polio vaccines are very safe. Mild redness or pain may occur at the site of injection. Oral polio vaccines cause about three cases of vaccine-associated paralytic poliomyelitis per million doses given. This compares with 5,000 cases per million who are paralysed following a polio infection. Both types of vaccine are generally safe to give during pregnancy and in those who have HIV/AIDS but are otherwise well. However, the emergence of circulating vaccine-derived poliovirus (cVDPV), a form of the vaccine virus that has reverted to causing poliomyelitis, has led to the development of novel oral polio vaccine type 2 (nOPV2) which aims to make the vaccine safer and thus stop further outbreaks of cVDPV2.

The first successful demonstration of a polio vaccine was by Hilary Koprowski in 1950, with a live attenuated virus which people drank. The vaccine was not approved for use in the United States, but was used successfully elsewhere. The success of an inactivated (killed) polio vaccine, developed by Jonas Salk, was announced in 1955. Another attenuated live oral polio vaccine was developed by Albert Sabin and came into commercial use in 1961.

Polio vaccine is on the World Health Organization's List of Essential Medicines.

Medical uses

Interruption of person-to-person transmission of the virus by vaccination is important in global polio eradication, since no long-term carrier state exists for poliovirus in individuals with normal immune function, polio viruses have no non-primate reservoir in nature, and survival of the virus in the environment for an extended period of time appears to be remote. There are two types of vaccine: inactivated polio vaccine (IPV) and oral polio vaccine (OPV).

Inactivated
When the IPV (injection) is used, 90% or more of individuals develop protective antibodies to all three serotypes of polio virus after two doses of inactivated polio vaccine (IPV), and at least 99% are immune to polio virus following three doses. The duration of immunity induced by IPV is not known with certainty, although a complete series is thought to provide protection for many years. IPV replaced the oral vaccine in many developed countries in the 1990s mainly due to the (small) risk of vaccine-derived polio in the oral vaccine.

Attenuated
Oral polio vaccines were easier to administer than IPV, as it eliminated the need for sterile syringes and therefore was more suitable for mass vaccination campaigns. OPV also provided longer-lasting immunity than the Salk vaccine, as it provides both humoral immunity and cell-mediated immunity.

One dose of OPV produces immunity to all three poliovirus serotypes in roughly 50% of recipients. Three doses of live-attenuated OPV produce protective antibodies to all three poliovirus types in more than 95% of recipients. OPV produces excellent immunity in the intestine, the primary site of wild poliovirus entry, which helps prevent infection with wild virus in areas where the virus is endemic. The live virus used in the vaccine can rarely shed in the stool and can rarely spread to others within a community. The live virus also has stringent requirements for transport and storage, which are a problem in some hot or remote areas. As with other live-virus vaccines, immunity initiated by OPV is probably lifelong.

The trivalent (against wild types 1, 2, and 3) OPV has been used to nearly eradicate polio infection worldwide. Led by the Global Polio Eradication Initiative, 155 countries switched to use the bivalent (against wild types 1 and 3) between 17 April and 1 May 2016. The bivalent OPV is more effective against types 1 and 3, but does not cover type 2. The United States as of 2017 continues to recommend the use of a trivalent version, but a fully inactivated version. The switch to the bivalent vaccine and associated missing immunity against type 2 strains, among other factors, led to outbreaks of circulating vaccine-derived poliovirus type 2(cVDPV2), which increased from 2 cases in 2016 to 1037 cases in 2020. As a response, a novel oral polio vaccine type 2 (nOPV2) was developed with the aim to provide a safer form of vaccination against type 2 strains with less risk of reverting to infectious polio.

Schedule

In countries with endemic polio or where the risk of imported cases is high, the WHO recommends OPV vaccine at birth followed by a primary series of three OPV doses and at least one IPV dose starting at 6 weeks of age, with a minimum of 4 weeks between OPV doses. In countries with >90% immunization coverage and low risk of importation, the WHO recommends one or two IPV doses starting at 2 months of age followed by at least two OPV doses, with the doses separated by 4–8 weeks depending on the risk of exposure. In countries with the highest levels of coverage and the lowest risks of importation and transmission, the WHO recommends a primary series of three IPV injections, with a booster dose after an interval of six months or more if the first dose was administered before 2 months of age.

Side effects
The inactivated polio vaccines are very safe. Mild redness or pain may occur at the site of injection. Oral polio vaccine results in vaccine-associated paralytic poliomyelitis in about three per million doses. They are generally safe to give to those who are pregnant, and those who have HIV/AIDS, but who are otherwise well.

Allergic reaction to the vaccine 
Inactivated polio vaccine can cause an allergic reaction in a few people since the vaccine contains trace amounts of antibiotics, streptomycin, polymyxin B, and neomycin. It should not be given to anyone who has an allergic reaction to these medicines. Signs and symptoms of an allergic reaction, which usually appear within minutes or a few hours after receiving the injected vaccine, include breathing difficulties, weakness, hoarseness or wheezing, heart rate fluctuations, skin rash and dizziness.

Vaccine-induced polio

A potential, adverse effect of the OPV is its known ability to recombine to a form that causes neurological infection and paralysis. This genetic reversal of the pathogen to a virulent form takes a considerable time (at least 12 months) and does not affect the person who was originally vaccinated. The vaccine-derived attenuated virus is normally excreted from vaccinated people for a limited period. Thus, in areas with poor sanitation and low vaccination coverage, the spontaneous reversal of the vaccine-derived virus to a virulent form and its spreading in the environment can lead to unvaccinated people becoming infected. Clinical disease, including paralysis, caused by vaccine-derived poliovirus (VDPV) is indistinguishable from that caused by wild polioviruses. Outbreaks of vaccine-associated paralytic poliomyelitis (VAPP), caused by a circulating vaccine-derived poliovirus (cVDPV), have been reported, and tend to occur in areas of low coverage by OPV, presumably because the OPV is itself protective against the related outbreak strain. With wild polio cases at record lows, 2017 was the first year where more cases of cVDPV were recorded than the wild poliovirus, a trend that is expected to continue.

To combat this, the WHO in 2016, decided to switch from the trivalent polio vaccine to the bivalent polio vaccine. This vaccine no longer contains the type 2 polio virus because it was eradicated in 1999.

Contamination concerns
In 1960, the rhesus monkey kidney cells used to prepare the poliovirus vaccines were determined to be infected with the simian virus-40 (SV40), which was also discovered in 1960 and is a naturally occurring virus that infects monkeys. In 1961, SV40 was found to cause tumors in rodents. More recently, the virus was found in certain forms of cancer in humans, for instance brain and bone tumors, pleural and peritoneal mesothelioma, and some types of non-Hodgkin lymphoma. However, SV40 has not been determined to cause these cancers.

SV40 was found to be present in stocks of the injected form of the IPV in use between 1955 and 1963. It is not found in the OPV form. Over 98 million Americans received one or more doses of polio vaccine between 1955 and 1963 when a proportion of vaccine was contaminated with SV40; an estimated 10–30 million Americans may have received a dose of vaccine contaminated with SV40. Later analysis suggested that vaccines produced by the former Soviet bloc countries until 1980, and used in the USSR, China, Japan, and several African countries, may have been contaminated, meaning hundreds of millions more may have been exposed to SV40.

In 1998, the National Cancer Institute undertook a large study, using cancer case information from the institute's SEER database. The published findings from the study revealed no increased incidence of cancer in persons who may have received vaccine containing SV40. Another large study in Sweden examined cancer rates of 700,000 individuals who had received potentially contaminated polio vaccine as late as 1957; the study again revealed no increased cancer incidence between persons who received polio vaccines containing SV40 and those who did not. The question of whether SV40 causes cancer in humans remains controversial, however, and the development of improved assays for detection of SV40 in human tissues will be needed to resolve the controversy.

During the race to develop an oral polio vaccine, several large-scale human trials were undertaken. By 1958, the National Institutes of Health had determined that OPV produced using the Sabin strains were the safest. Between 1957 and 1960, however, Hilary Koprowski continued to administer his vaccine around the world. In Africa, the vaccines were administered to roughly one million people in the Belgian territories (now the Democratic Republic of the Congo, Rwanda, and Burundi). The results of these human trials have been controversial, and unfounded accusations in the 1990s arose that the vaccine had created the conditions necessary for transmission of simian immunodeficiency virus from chimpanzees to humans, causing HIV/AIDS. These hypotheses, however, have been conclusively refuted. By 2004, cases of poliomyelitis in Africa had been reduced to just a small number of isolated regions in the western portion of the continent, with sporadic cases elsewhere. Recent local opposition to vaccination campaigns have evolved due to lack of adequate information, often relating to fears that the vaccine might induce sterility. The disease has since resurged in Nigeria and in several other African nations without necessary information, which epidemiologists believe is due to refusals by certain local populations to allow their children to receive the polio vaccine.

Manufacture

Inactivated
The Salk vaccine, IPV, is based on three wild, virulent reference strains, Mahoney (type 1 poliovirus), MEF-1 (type 2 poliovirus), and Saukett (type 3 poliovirus), grown in a type of monkey kidney tissue culture (Vero cell line), which are then inactivated with formalin. The injected Salk vaccine confers IgG-mediated immunity in the bloodstream, which prevents polio infection from progressing to viremia and protects the motor neurons, thus eliminating the risk of bulbar polio and post-polio syndrome.

In the United States, vaccine is administered along with the tetanus, diphtheria, and acellular pertussis vaccines (DTaP) and a pediatric dose of hepatitis B vaccine. In the UK, IPV is combined with tetanus, diphtheria, pertussis, and Haemophilus influenzae type b vaccines.

Attenuated

OPV is an attenuated vaccine, produced by the passage of the virus through nonhuman cells at a subphysiological temperature, which produces spontaneous mutations in the viral genome. Oral polio vaccines were developed by several groups, one of which was led by Albert Sabin. Other groups, led by Hilary Koprowski and H.R. Cox, developed their own attenuated vaccine strains. In 1958, the National Institutes of Health created a special committee on live polio vaccines. The various vaccines were carefully evaluated for their ability to induce immunity to polio, while retaining a low incidence of neuropathogenicity in monkeys. Large-scale clinical trials performed in the Soviet Union in late 1950s to early 1960s by Mikhail Chumakov and his colleagues demonstrated safety and high efficacy of the vaccine. Based on these results, the Sabin strains were chosen for worldwide distribution. Fifty-seven nucleotide substitutions distinguish the attenuated Sabin 1 strain from its virulent parent (the Mahoney serotype), two nucleotide substitutions attenuate the Sabin 2 strain, and 10 substitutions are involved in attenuating the Sabin 3 strain. The primary attenuating factor common to all three Sabin vaccines is a mutation located in the virus's internal ribosome entry site, which alters stem-loop structures and reduces the ability of poliovirus to translate its RNA template within the host cell. The attenuated poliovirus in the Sabin vaccine replicates very efficiently in the gut, the primary site of infection and replication, but is unable to replicate efficiently within nervous system tissue. In 1961, type 1 and 2 monovalent oral poliovirus vaccine (MOPV) was licensed, and in 1962, type 3 MOPV was licensed. In 1963, trivalent OPV (TOPV) was licensed, and became the vaccine of choice in the United States and most other countries of the world, largely replacing the inactivated polio vaccine. A second wave of mass immunizations led to a further dramatic decline in the number of polio cases. Between 1962 and 1965, about 100 million Americans (roughly 56% of the population at that time) received the Sabin vaccine. The result was a substantial reduction in the number of poliomyelitis cases, even from the much-reduced levels following the introduction of the Salk vaccine.

OPV is usually provided in vials containing 10–20 doses of vaccine. A single dose of oral polio vaccine (usually two drops) contains 1,000,000 infectious units of Sabin 1 (effective against PV1), 100,000 infectious units of the Sabin 2 strain, and 600,000 infectious units of Sabin 3. The vaccine contains small traces of antibiotics—neomycin and streptomycin—but does not contain preservatives.

History

In a generic sense, vaccination works by priming the immune system with an 'immunogen'. Stimulating immune response, by use of an infectious agent, is known as immunization. The development of immunity to polio efficiently blocks person-to-person transmission of wild poliovirus, thereby protecting both individual vaccine recipients and the wider community.

The development of two polio vaccines led to the first modern mass inoculations. The last cases of paralytic poliomyelitis caused by endemic transmission of wild virus in the United States occurred in 1979, with an outbreak among the Amish in several Midwest states.

1930s 
In the 1930s, poliovirus was perceived as especially terrifying, as little was known of how the disease was transmitted or how it could be prevented. This virus was also notable for primarily impacting affluent children, making it a prime target for vaccine development, despite its relatively low mortality and morbidity. Despite this, the community of researchers in the field thus far had largely observed an informal moratorium on any vaccine development as it was perceived to present too high a risk for too little likelihood of success.

This shifted in the early 1930s when American groups took up the challenge: Maurice Brodie led a team from the public health laboratory of the city of New York and Dr. John A. Kolmer collaborated with the Research Institute of Cutaneous Medicine in Philadelphia. The rivalry between these two researchers lent itself to a race-like mentality which, combined with a lack of oversight of medical studies, was reflected in the methodology and outcomes of each of these early vaccine development ventures.

Kolmer's live vaccine 
Kolmer began his vaccine development project in 1932 and ultimately focused on producing an attenuated or live virus vaccine. Inspired by the success of vaccines for rabies and yellow fever, he hoped to use a similar process to denature the polio virus. In order to go about attenuating his polio vaccine, he repeatedly passed the virus through monkeys. Using methods of production that were later described as "hair-raisingly amateurish, the therapeutic equivalent of bath-tub gin," Kolmer ground the spinal cords of his infected monkeys and soaked them in a salt solution. He then filtered the solution through mesh, treated it with ricinolate, and refrigerated the product for 14 days to ultimately create what would later be prominently critiqued as a "veritable witches brew".

In keeping with the norms of the time, Kolmer completed a relatively small animal trial with 42 monkeys before proceeding to self experimentation in 1934. He tested his vaccine upon himself, his two children, and his assistant. He gave his vaccine to just 23 more children before declaring it safe and sending it out to doctors and health departments for a larger test of efficacy. By April 1935, he was able to report having tested the vaccine on 100 children without ill effect. Kolmer's first formal presentation of results would not come about until November 1935 where he presented the results of 446 children and adults he had vaccinated with his attenuated vaccine. He also reported that together the Research Institute of Cutaneous Medicine and the Merrell Company of Cincinnati (the manufacturer who held the patent for his ricinoleating process) had distributed 12,000 doses of vaccine to some 700 physicians across the United States and Canada. Kolmer did not describe any monitoring of this experimental vaccination program nor did he provide these physicians with instructions in how to administer the vaccine or how to report side effects. Kolmer dedicated the bulk of his publications thereafter to explaining what he believed to be the cause of the 10+ reported cases of paralytic polio following vaccination, in many cases in towns where no polio outbreak had occurred. Six of these cases had been fatal. Kolmer had no control group but asserted that many more children would have gotten sick.

Brodie's inactivated vaccine 
At nearly the same time as Kolmer's project, Maurice Brodie had joined immunologist Dr. William H. Park at the New York City Health Department where they worked together on poliovirus. With the aid of grant funding from the President's Birthday Ball Commission (a predecessor to what would become the March of Dimes), Brodie was able to pursue development of an inactivated or "killed virus" vaccine. Brodie's process also began by grinding the spinal cords of infectious monkeys and then treating the cords with various germicides, ultimately finding a solution of formaldehyde to be the most effective. By 1 June 1934, Brodie was able to publish his first scholarly article describing his successful induction of immunity in three monkeys with inactivated polio virus. Through continued study on an additional 26 monkeys, Brodie ultimately concluded that administration of live virus vaccine tended to result in humoral immunity while administration of killed virus vaccine tended to result in tissue immunity.

Soon after, following a similar protocol to Kolmer, Brodie proceeded with self experimentation upon himself and his co-workers at the NYC Health Department laboratory. Brodie's progress was eagerly covered by popular press as the public hoped for a successful vaccine to become available. Such reporting did not make mention of the 12 children in a New York City Asylum who were subjected to early safety trials. As none of the subjects experienced ill effects, Dr. Park, described by contemporaries as "never one to let grass grow under his feet," declared the vaccine safe. When a severe polio outbreak overwhelmed Kern County, California it became the first trial site for the new vaccine on very short notice. Between November 1934 - May 1935, over 1,500 doses of the vaccine were administered in Kern County. While initial results were very promising, insufficient staffing and poor protocol design left Brodie open to criticism when he published the California results in August 1935. Through private physicians, Brodie also conducted a broader field study, including 9,000 children who received the vaccine and 4,500 age- and location-matched controls who did not receive a vaccine. Again, results were promising. Of those who received the vaccine, only a few went on to develop polio. Most had been exposed prior to vaccination and none had received the full series of vaccine doses being studied. Additionally, a polio epidemic in Raleigh, North Carolina provided an opportunity for the U.S. Public Health Service to conduct a highly structured trial of the Brodie vaccine using funding from the Birthday Ball Commission.

Academic reception 
While their work was ongoing, the larger community of bacteriologists began to raise concerns regarding the safety and efficacy of the new poliovirus vaccines. At this time there was very little oversight of medical studies, and ethical treatment of study participants largely relied upon moral pressure from peer academic scientists. Brodie's inactivated vaccines faced scrutiny from many who felt killed virus vaccines could not be efficacious. While researchers were able to replicate the tissue immunity he had produced in his animal trials, prevailing wisdom was that humoral immunity was essential for an efficacious vaccine. Kolmer directly questioned the killed virus approach in scholarly journals. Kolmer's studies however had raised even more concern with increasing reports of children becoming paralysed following vaccination with his live virus vaccine and notably, with paralysis beginning at the arm rather than the foot in many cases. Both Kolmer and Brodie were called to present their research at the Annual Meeting of the American Public Health Association in Milwaukee WI in October 1935. Additionally, Dr. Thomas M. Rivers was asked to discuss each of the presented papers as a prominent critic of the vaccine development effort. This resulted in the APHA arranging a Symposium on Poliomyelitis to be delivered at the Annual Meeting of their Southern Branch the following month. It was during the discussion at this meeting that Dr. James Leake of the U.S. Public Health Service stood to immediately present clinical evidence that the Kolmer vaccine had caused several deaths and then allegedly accused Kolmer of being a murderer. As Rivers recalled in his oral history, "All hell broke loose, and it seemed as if everybody was trying to talk at the same time....Jimmy Leake used the strongest language that I have ever heard used at a scientific meeting." In response to the attacks from all sides, Brodie was reported to have stood up and stated, "It looks as though, according to Dr. Rivers, my vaccine is no good, and, according to Dr. Leake, Dr Kolmer's is dangerous." Kolmer simply responded by stating, "Gentlemen, this is one time I wish the floor would open up and swallow me." Ultimately, Kolmer's live vaccine was undoubtedly shown to be dangerous and had already been withdrawn in September 1935 prior to the Milwaukee meeting. While the consensus of the symposium was largely skeptical of the efficacy of Brodie's vaccine, its safety was not in question and the recommendation was for a much larger well-controlled trial. However, when three children became ill with paralytic polio following a dose of the vaccine, the directors of the Warm Springs Foundation in Georgia (acting as the primary funders for the project) requested it be withdrawn in December 1935. Following its withdrawal, the previously observed moratorium on human poliomyelitis vaccine development resumed and there would not be another attempt for nearly 20 years.

While Brodie had arguably made the most progress in the pursuit of a poliovirus vaccine, he suffered the most significant career repercussions due to his status as a less widely known researcher. Modern researchers recognize that Brodie may well have developed an effective polio vaccine, however the basic science and technology of the time was insufficient to understand and utilize this breakthrough. Brodie's work using formalin-inactivated virus would later become the basis for the Salk vaccine, but he would not live to see this success. Brodie was fired from his position within three months of the symposium's publication. While he was able to find another laboratory position, he died of a heart attack only three years later at age 36. By contrast, Park, who was believed in the community to be reaching senility at this point in his older age, was able to retire from his position with honors prior to his death in 1939. Kolmer, already an established and well respected researcher, returned to Temple University as a professor of medicine. Kolmer had a very productive career, receiving multiple awards, and publishing countless papers, articles, and textbooks up until his retirement in 1957.

1948
A breakthrough came in 1948 when a research group headed by John Enders at the Children's Hospital Boston successfully cultivated the poliovirus in human tissue in the laboratory. This group had recently successfully grown mumps in cell culture. In March 1948, Thomas H. Weller was attempting to grow varicella virus in embryonic lung tissue. He had inoculated the planned number of tubes when he noticed that there were a few unused tubes. He retrieved a sample of mouse brain infected with poliovirus and added it to the remaining test tubes, on the off chance that the virus might grow. The varicella cultures failed to grow, but the polio cultures were successful. This development greatly facilitated vaccine research and ultimately allowed for the development of vaccines against polio. Enders and his colleagues, Thomas H. Weller and Frederick C. Robbins, were recognized in 1954 for their efforts with a Nobel Prize in Physiology or Medicine. Other important advances that led to the development of polio vaccines were: the identification of three poliovirus serotypes (Poliovirus type 1 – PV1, or Mahoney; PV2, Lansing; and PV3, Leon); the finding that prior to paralysis, the virus must be present in the blood; and the demonstration that administration of antibodies in the form of gamma globulin protects against paralytic polio.

1950–1955 

During the early 1950s, polio rates in the U.S. were above 25,000 annually; in 1952 and 1953, the U.S. experienced an outbreak of 58,000 and 35,000 polio cases, respectively, up from a typical number of some 20,000 a year, with deaths in those years numbering 3,200 and 1,400. Amid this U.S. polio epidemic, millions of dollars were invested in finding and marketing a polio vaccine by commercial interests, including Lederle Laboratories in New York under the direction of H. R. Cox. Also working at Lederle was Polish-born virologist and immunologist Hilary Koprowski of the Wistar Institute in Philadelphia, who tested the first successful polio vaccine, in 1950. His vaccine, however, being a live attenuated virus taken orally, was still in the research stage and would not be ready for use until five years after Jonas Salk's polio vaccine (a dead-virus injectable vaccine) had reached the market. Koprowski's attenuated vaccine was prepared by successive passages through the brains of Swiss albino mice. By the seventh passage, the vaccine strains could no longer infect nervous tissue or cause paralysis. After one to three further passages on rats, the vaccine was deemed safe for human use. On 27 February 1950, Koprowski's live, attenuated vaccine was tested for the first time on an 8-year-old boy living at Letchworth Village, an institution for physically and mentally disabled people located in New York. After the child had no side effects, Koprowski enlarged his experiment to include 19 other children.

Jonas Salk 

The first effective polio vaccine was developed in 1952 by Jonas Salk and a team at the University of Pittsburgh that included Julius Youngner, Byron Bennett, L. James Lewis, and Lorraine Friedman, which required years of subsequent testing. Salk went on CBS radio to report a successful test on a small group of adults and children on 26 March 1953; two days later, the results were published in JAMA. Leone N. Farrell invented a key laboratory technique that enabled the mass production of the vaccine by a team she led in Toronto. Beginning 23 February 1954, the vaccine was tested at Arsenal Elementary School and the Watson Home for Children in Pittsburgh, Pennsylvania.

Salk's vaccine was then used in a test called the Francis Field Trial, led by Thomas Francis, the largest medical experiment in history at that time. The test began with about 4,000 children at Franklin Sherman Elementary School in McLean, Virginia, and eventually involved 1.8 million children, in 44 states from Maine to California. By the conclusion of the study, roughly 440,000 received one or more injections of the vaccine, about 210,000 children received a placebo, consisting of harmless culture media, and 1.2 million children received no vaccination and served as a control group, who would then be observed to see if any contracted polio.

The results of the field trial were announced 12 April 1955 (the tenth anniversary of the death of President Franklin D. Roosevelt, whose paralytic illness was generally believed to have been caused by polio). The Salk vaccine had been 60–70% effective against PV1 (poliovirus type 1), over 90% effective against PV2 and PV3, and 94% effective against the development of bulbar polio. Soon after Salk's vaccine was licensed in 1955, children's vaccination campaigns were launched. In the U.S, following a mass immunization campaign promoted by the March of Dimes, the annual number of polio cases fell from 35,000 in 1953 to 5,600 by 1957. By 1961 only 161 cases were recorded in the United States.

A week before the announcement of the Francis Field Trial results in April 1955, Pierre Lépine at the Pasteur Institute in Paris had also announced an effective polio vaccine.

Safety incidents
In April 1955, soon after mass polio vaccination began in the US, the Surgeon General began to receive reports of patients who contracted paralytic polio about a week after being vaccinated with Salk polio vaccine from the Cutter pharmaceutical company, with the paralysis starting in the limb the vaccine was injected into. The Cutter vaccine had been used in vaccinating 409,000 children in the western and midwestern United States.
Later investigations showed that the Cutter vaccine had caused 260 cases of polio, killing 11.
In response, the Surgeon General pulled all polio vaccines made by Cutter Laboratories from the market, but not before 260 cases of paralytic illness had occurred. Eli Lilly, Parke-Davis, Pitman-Moore and Wyeth polio vaccines were also reported to have paralyzed numerous children. It was soon discovered that some lots of Salk polio vaccine made by Cutter, Wyeth,  and the  other labs had not been properly inactivated, allowing live poliovirus into more than 100,000 doses of vaccine. In May 1955, the National Institutes of Health and Public Health Services established a Technical Committee on Poliomyelitis Vaccine to test and review all polio vaccine lots and advise the Public Health Service as to which lots should be released for public use. These incidents reduced public confidence in polio vaccine, leading to a drop in vaccination rates.

1961

At the same time that Salk was testing his vaccine, both Albert Sabin and Hilary Koprowski continued working on developing a vaccine using live virus. During a meeting in Stockholm to discuss polio vaccines in November 1955, Sabin presented results obtained on a group of 80 volunteers, while Koprowski read a paper detailing the findings of a trial enrolling 150 people. Sabin and Koprowski both eventually succeeded in developing vaccines. Because of the commitment to the Salk vaccine in America, Sabin and Koprowski both did their testing outside the United States, Sabin in Mexico and the Soviet Union, Koprowski in the Congo and Poland. In 1957, Sabin developed a trivalent vaccine containing attenuated strains of all three types of poliovirus. In 1959, ten million children in the Soviet Union received the Sabin oral vaccine. For this work, Sabin was given the medal of the Order of Friendship of Peoples, described as the Soviet Union's highest civilian honor. Sabin's oral vaccine using live virus came into commercial use in 1961.

Once Sabin's oral vaccine became widely available, it supplanted Salk's injected vaccine, which had been tarnished in the public's opinion by the Cutter incident of 1955, in which Salk vaccines improperly prepared by one company resulted in several children dying or becoming paralyzed.

1987 
An enhanced-potency IPV was licensed in the United States in November 1987, and is currently the vaccine of choice there. The first dose of polio vaccine is given shortly after birth, usually between 1 and 2 months of age, and a second dose is given at 4 months of age. The timing of the third dose depends on the vaccine formulation, but should be given between 6 and 18 months of age. A booster vaccination is given at 4 to 6 years of age, for a total of four doses at or before school entry. In some countries, a fifth vaccination is given during adolescence. Routine vaccination of adults (18 years of age and older) in developed countries is neither necessary nor recommended because most adults are already immune and have a very small risk of exposure to wild poliovirus in their home countries. In 2002, a pentavalent (five-component) combination vaccine (called Pediarix) containing IPV was approved for use in the United States.

1988

A global effort to eradicate polio, led by the World Health Organization (WHO), UNICEF, and the Rotary Foundation, began in 1988, and has relied largely on the oral polio vaccine developed by Albert Sabin and Mikhail Chumakov (Sabin-Chumakov vaccine).

After 1990
Polio was eliminated in the Americas by 1994. The disease was officially eliminated in 36 Western Pacific countries, including China and Australia, in 2000. Europe was declared polio-free in 2002. Since January 2011, no cases of the disease have been reported in India, hence in February 2012, the country was taken off the WHO list of polio-endemic countries. In March 2014, India was declared a polio-free country.

Although poliovirus transmission has been interrupted in much of the world, transmission of wild poliovirus does continue and creates an ongoing risk for the importation of wild poliovirus into previously polio-free regions. If importations of poliovirus occur, outbreaks of poliomyelitis may develop, especially in areas with low vaccination coverage and poor sanitation. As a result, high levels of vaccination coverage must be maintained. In November 2013, the WHO announced a polio outbreak in Syria. In response, the Armenian government put out a notice asking Syrian Armenians under age 15 to get the polio vaccine. As of 2014, polio virus had spread to 10 countries, mainly in Africa, Asia, and the Middle East, with Pakistan, Syria, and Cameroon advising vaccinations to outbound travellers.

Polio vaccination programs have been resisted by some people in Pakistan, Afghanistan, and Nigeria - the three countries as of 2017 with remaining polio cases. Almost all Muslim religious and political leaders have endorsed the vaccine, but a fringe minority believes that the vaccines are secretly being used for sterilization of Muslims. The fact that the CIA organized a fake vaccination program in 2011 to help find Osama Bin Laden is an additional cause of distrust. In 2015, the WHO announced a deal with the Taliban to encourage them to distribute the vaccine in areas they control. However, the Pakistani Taliban was not supportive. On 11 September 2016, two unidentified gunmen associated with the Pakistani Taliban, Jamaat-ul-Ahrar, shot Zakaullah Khan, a doctor who was administering polio vaccines in Pakistan. The leader of the Jamaat-ul-Ahrar claimed responsibility for the shooting and stated that the group would continue this type of attack. Such resistance to and skepticism of vaccinations has consequently slowed down the polio eradication process within the two remaining endemic countries.

Travel requirements 

Travellers who wish to enter or leave certain countries must be vaccinated against polio, usually at most 12 months and at least 4 weeks before crossing the border, and be able to present a vaccination record/certificate at the border checks. Most requirements apply only to travel to or from so-called 'polio-endemic', 'polio-affected', 'polio-exporting', 'polio-transmission', or 'high-risk' countries. As of August 2020, Afghanistan and Pakistan are the only polio-endemic countries in the world (where wild polio has not yet been eradicated). Several countries have additional precautionary polio vaccination travel requirements, for example to and from 'key at-risk countries', which as of December 2020 include China, Indonesia, Mozambique, Myanmar, and Papua New Guinea.

Society and culture

Cost

Misconceptions

A misconception has been present in Pakistan that polio vaccine contained haram ingredients and could cause impotence and infertility in male children, leading some parents not to have their children vaccinated. This belief is most common in the Khyber Pakhtunkhwa province and the FATA region. Attacks on polio vaccination teams have also occurred, thereby hampering international efforts to eradicate polio in Pakistan and globally.

References

Further reading

External links 
 
 History of Vaccines Website – History of Polio History of Vaccines, a project of the College of Physicians of Philadelphia
 PBS.org – 'People and Discoveries: Salk Produces Polio Vaccine 1952', Public Broadcasting Service (PBS)
 
 

Polio
1952 in biology
1955 introductions
American inventions
Inactivated vaccines
Live vaccines
Vaccines
World Health Organization essential medicines (vaccines)
Wikipedia medicine articles ready to translate